The 1974 Atlantic hurricane season was a cycle of the annual tropical cyclone season in the Atlantic Ocean in the Northern Hemisphere. There was near-average activity during the season, which officially began on June 1, 1974 and ended on November 30, 1974. These dates, adopted by convention, historically describe the period in each year when most tropical systems form. The first system of the season, Tropical Depression One, formed on June 22. The final system of the season, Tropical Depression Seventeen, dissipated on November 11.

The 1974 season produced twenty tropical or subtropical depressions, of which eleven reached tropical (7) or subtropical (4) storm intensity. Four of the tropical storms became hurricanes, of which two became major hurricanes. At Category 4 on the Saffir–Simpson scale, Hurricane Carmen was the most intense tropical cyclone of the season. It threatened two densely populated areas during its duration, Belize City, Belize and New Orleans, Louisiana, but veered away at the last moment each time. Even so, the storm caused much flooding and crop damage in and around the Yucatán Peninsula and Gulf Coast of the United States. The deadliest cyclone of 1974 was Hurricane Fifi (Category 2), which killed 6,000–8,000 people in Honduras, making it one of the deadliest Atlantic hurricanes on record. As a result of their intensity and damage caused, the names Carman and Fifi were subsequently retired from reuse in the North Atlantic by the World Meteorological Organization.

This timeline documents tropical cyclone formations, strengthening, weakening, landfalls, extratropical transitions, and dissipations during the season. It includes information that was not released throughout the season, meaning that data from post-storm reviews by the National Hurricane Center, such as a storm that was not initially warned upon, has been included.

By convention, meteorologists one time zone when issuing forecasts and making observations: Coordinated Universal Time (UTC), and also use the 24-hour clock (where 00:00 = midnight UTC). In this time line, all information is listed by UTC first with the respective local time included in parentheses.

Timeline

June

June 1
 The 1974 Atlantic hurricane season officially begins.

June 22
 1200 UTC (7 a.m. CDT)Tropical Depression One forms in the Gulf of Mexico.

June 24
 1800 UTC (1 p.m. CDT)Subtropical Depression One forms in the Gulf of Mexico.

June 25
 0000 UTC (7 p.m. CDT June 24)Subtropical Depression One strengthens into a subtropical storm.
 1200 UTC (7 a.m. CDT)Subtropical Storm One reaches its peak intensity and makes landfall just north of Tampa, Florida, with winds of 65 mph (100 km/h).

June 26
 0000 UTC (8 p.m. EDT June 25)Subtropical Storm One becomes extratropical off the coast of Florida.
 1200 UTC (7 a.m. CDT)Tropical Depression One dissipates in the central Gulf of Mexico.

July

July 13
 1800 UTC (1 p.m. CDT)Tropical Depression Two forms in the northern Gulf of Mexico just south of the Florida Panhandle.

July 16
 0000 UTC (8 p.m. EDT July 15)Subtropical Depression Two forms off the Eastern coast of the United States.

July 17
 1200 UTC (8 a.m. EDT)Subtropical Depression Two strengthens into a subtropical storm.
 1800 UTC (1 p.m. CDT)Tropical Depression Two makes landfall near Galveston, Texas, and dissipates.

July 18
1200 UTC (8 a.m. EDT)Subtropical Storm Two reaches its peak intensity of 50 mph (85 km/h).

July 20
 0000 UTC (8 p.m. EDT July 19)Subtropical Storm Two becomes extratropical east of Newfoundland, Canada.

July 31
 1200 UTC (10 a.m. AST)Tropical Depression Three forms just northwest of the Cape Verde Islands off the coast of Africa.

August

August 2
 1200 UTC (10 a.m. AST)Tropical Depression Three dissipates in the central Atlantic Ocean.

August 10
 1200 UTC (8 a.m. EDT)Subtropical Storm Three forms south of Cape Cod, Massachusetts.

August 12
1200 UTC (8 a.m. EDT)Tropical Depression Four forms in the  southern tropical Atlantic Ocean.

August 13
 1200 UTC (8 a.m. EDT)Tropical Depression Four strengthens into a tropical storm and is named Alma.
 1800 UTC (2 p.m. EDT)Tropical Storm Alma reaches a peak intensity of 65 mph (100 km/h).

August 14
 1200 UTC (8 a.m. EDT)Tropical Storm Alma makes landfall on Trinidad and Tobago with winds of 40 mph (65 km/h).
 1200 UTC (8 a.m. EDT)Subtropical Storm Three reaches its peak strength of 60 mph (95 km/h).
 1800 UTC (2 p.m. EDT)Tropical Storm Alma makes landfall on Venezuela with winds of 40 mph (65 km/h).

August 15
 0600 UTC (2 a.m. EDT)Subtropical Storm Three is absorbed by a frontal boundary just southeast of Nova Scotia, Canada.
 1800 UTC (2 p.m. EDT)Tropical Storm Alma rapidly dissipates over the mountains of Venezuela.

August 24
 1200 UTC (7 a.m. CDT)Tropical Depression Five forms north of Cuba in the Gulf of Mexico.

August 26
 1200 UTC (8 a.m. EDT)Tropical Depression Six forms in the central Atlantic far from land.
 1200 UTC (7 a.m. CDT)Tropical Depression Five makes landfall near Galveston, Texas, and dissipates.

August 28
 0600 UTC (2 a.m. EDT)Tropical Depression Six strengthens into a tropical storm and is named Becky.
 1800 UTC (2 p.m. EDT)Tropical Storm Becky strengthens into a hurricane.

August 29
 0600 UTC (2 a.m. EDT)Tropical Depression Seven forms off the Greater Antilles.
 1200 UTC (8 a.m. EDT)Hurricane Becky reaches category 2 hurricane strength.

August 30
 0600 UTC (2 a.m. EDT)Hurricane Becky reaches major hurricane strength and a peak intensity of 115 mph (185 km/h).
 1200 UTC (8 a.m. EDT)Tropical Depression Seven strengthens into a tropical storm and is named Carmen.

August 31
 1200 UTC (8 a.m. EDT)Tropical Storm Carmen strengthens into a hurricane.
 1800 UTC (3 p.m. AST)Hurricane Becky weakens into a category 2 hurricane.

September

September 1
 0600 UTC (2 a.m. EDT)Hurricane Carmen becomes a category 2 hurricane.
 1200 UTC (8 a.m. EDT)Hurricane Carmen becomes a major hurricane.
 1200 UTC (8 a.m. EDT)Hurricane Becky weakens into a category 1 hurricane.
 1800 UTC (2 p.m. EDT)Hurricane Carmen becomes a category 4 hurricane.

September 2
 0000 UTC (9 pm. AST September 1)Hurricane Becky weakens into a tropical storm.
 0600 UTC (1 a.m. CDT)Hurricane Carmen reaches its peak intensity of 150 mph (240 km/h).
 1200 UTC (7 a.m. CDT)Hurricane Carmen makes landfall on the Yucatan Peninsula with winds of 140 mph (220 km/h).
 1200 UTC (8 a.m. EDT)Tropical Storm Becky becomes extratropical in the frigid waters of the North Atlantic Ocean.
 1800 UTC (1 p.m. CDT)Hurricane Carmen weakens into a category 2 hurricane. 1800 UTC (1 p.m. CDT)Hurricane Carmen weakens into a category 2 hurricane.
 1800 UTC (2 p.m. EDT)Tropical Depression Nine forms in the central Atlantic ocean.
1800 UTC (3 p.m. AST)Tropical Depression Eight forms off the coast of Africa.

September 3
 0000 UTC (7 p.m. CDT September 2)Hurricane Carmen weakens into a tropical storm.
 1800 UTC (2 p.m. EDT)Tropical Depression Nine in the central Atlantic strengthens into a tropical storm and is named Dolly. At the same time, it reaches its peak intensity of 50 mph (85 km/h).

September 4
 1800 UTC (2 p.m. EDT)Tropical Depression Ten forms in the central Atlantic Ocean.

September 5
 1200 UTC (7 a.m. CDT)Tropical Storm Carmen restrengthens into a hurricane.
 1200 UTC (8 a.m. EDT)Tropical Storm Dolly becomes extratropical in the frigid waters of the North Atlantic.

September 6
 1800 UTC (1 p.m. CDT)Hurricane Carmen restrengthens into a category 2 hurricane.

September 7
 0000 UTC (7 p.m. CDT September 6)Hurricane Carmen restrengthens into a major hurricane.
 1800 UTC (1 p.m. CDT)Hurricane Carmen restrengthens into a category 4 hurricane.

September 8
 0000 UTC (7 p.m. CDT September 7)Hurricane Carmen regains its peak intensity of 150 mph (240 km/h).
 0600 UTC (1 a.m. CDT) - Hurricane Carmen weakens into a category 3 hurricane as it makes landfall south of Morgan City, Louisiana, with winds of 120 mph (195 km/h).
 1200 UTC (7 a.m. CDT) - Hurricane Carmen weakens into a category 1 hurricane.
 1800 UTC (1 p.m. CDT) - Hurricane Carmen weakens into a tropical storm.

September 9
 0000 UTC (7 p.m. CDT September 8)Tropical Storm Carmen weakens into a tropical depression.
 1800 UTC (2 p.m. EDT)Tropical Depression Ten strengthens into a tropical storm and is named Elaine.

September 10
 0600 UTC (1 a.m. CDT)Tropical Depression Carmen dissipates just southeast of Waco, Texas.
 1200 UTC (8 a.m. EDT)Tropical Storm Elaine reaches its peak intensity of 70 mph (110 km/h).

September 11
 1200 UTC (8 a.m. EDT)Tropical Depression Eight makes landfall of Great Inagua Island in the Bahamas and dissipates.
 September 14 0000 UTC (8 p.m. EDT September 13)Tropical Storm Elaine becomes extratropical in the cold waters of the North Atlantic Ocean.
 1200 UTC (8 a.m. EDT)Tropical Depression Eleven forms in the Caribbean Sea just south of Puerto Rico.September 16 1800 UTC (2 p.m. EDT)Tropical Depression Eleven strengthens into a tropical storm and is named Fifi.September 17 0600 UTC (2 a.m. EDT)Tropical Storm Fifi becomes a hurricane.September 18 0600 UTC (2 a.m. EDT)Hurricane Fifi strengthens into a category 2 hurricane.
 1200 UTC (8 a.m. EDT)Tropical Depression Twelve forms in the central Atlantic Ocean.
 1800 UTC (1 p.m. CDT)Hurricane Fifi reaches its peak intensity of 110 mph (180 km/h) while paralleling the Honduran coastline.September 20 0000 UTC (7 p.m. CDT September 19)Hurricane Fifi makes landfall at the base of the Yucatan Peninsula in Guatemala with winds of 105 mph (170 km/h) and weakens into a tropical storm.
 1800 UTC (1 p.m. CDT)Tropical Storm Fifi weakens into a tropical depression.
 1800 UTC (2 p.m. EDT)Tropical Depression Twelve dissipates northwest of Bermuda.September 22 1200 UTC (4 a.m. PDT)Tropical Depression Fifi restrengthens into a tropical storm in the Pacific Ocean. Following policy at the time, it is renamed Orlene.September 23 1200 UTC (8 a.m. EDT)Tropical Depression Thirteen forms in the western Caribbean Sea.September 27 1200 UTC (8 a.m. EDT)Tropical Depression Fourteen forms east of the Lesser Antilles.
 1200 UTC (8 a.m. EDT)Tropical Depression Thirteen dissipates just south of Cedar Key, Florida.September 28 1800 UTC (2 p.m. EDT)Tropical Depression Fourteen strengthens into a tropical storm and is named Gertrude.September 29 0000 UTC (8 p.m. EDT September 28)Tropical Storm Gertrude rapidly strengthens into a hurricane and reaches its peak intensity of 75 mph (120 km/h).September 30 1800 UTC (2 p.m. EDT)Hurricane Gertrude weakens into a tropical storm.

OctoberOctober 2 1200 UTC (8 a.m. EDT)Tropical Storm Gertrude weakens into a tropical depression.
 1800 UTC (2 p.m. EDT)Tropical Depression Gertrude makes landfall on Carriacou Island in the Grenadines with winds of 35 mph (55 km/h).October 4 0000 UTC (8 p.m. EDT October 3)Tropical Depression Gertrude dissipates.
 0000 UTC (8 p.m. EDT October 3)Tropical Depression Fifteen forms in the waters off Cuba.October 5 1200  UTC (8 a.m. EDT)Tropical Depression Fifteen becomes subtropical.October 6 0000 UTC (8 p.m. EDT October 5)The subtropical depression that used to be Tropical Depression Fifteen strengthens into a subtropical storm and is numbered Four.
 0600 UTC (2 a.m. EDT)Subtropical Storm Four makes landfall on Grand Bahama Island with winds of 45 mph (70 km/h).October 7 0000 UTC (8 p.m. EDT October 6)Subtropical Storm Four reaches its peak intensity of 50 mph (80 km/h).October 8 1200 UTC (8 a.m. EDT)Subtropical Storm Four weakens into a subtropical depression and becomes extratropical.October 30 1200 UTC (8 a.m. EDT)Tropical Depression Sixteen forms in the central Atlantic Ocean.

NovemberNovember 2 1200 UTC (8 a.m. EDT)Tropical Depression Sixteen dissipates.November 10 1200 UTC (8 a.m. EDT)Tropical Depression Seventeen forms north of the Dominican Republic.November 12 1200 UTC (8 a.m. EDT)}Tropical Depression Seventeen dissipates.November 30'''
 The 1974 Atlantic hurricane season officially ends.

See also

 Lists of Atlantic hurricanes

Notes

References

1974 Atlantic hurricane season
1974 season timeline
Articles which contain graphical timelines